Beetham may refer to:

Places

In England
Beetham, Cumbria

In Trinidad and Tobago
Beetham Estate Gardens, a neighbourhood in Port of Spain
Beetham Highway, a major highway

People
Bentley Beetham (1886–1963), British mountaineer, ornithologist and photographer
Bruce Beetham (1936–1997), New Zealand academic and politician
Charles Beetham (1914–1997), American middle-distance runner
David Beetham, British social theorist
Edward Beetham (1905–1979), Governor of Trinidad and Tobago
George Beetham (1840–1915), New Zealand politician and alpinist
Isabella Beetham, British silhouette artist
Michael Beetham (1923–2015), Marshal of the Royal Air Force

See also
Beetham Organization, a property development and investment company
Beetham Tower (disambiguation), various British high-rise buildings financed and owned by the Beetham Organization